Alumni (singular: alumnus (masculine) or alumna (feminine)) are former students of a school, college, or university who have either attended or graduated in some fashion from the institution. The feminine plural alumnae is sometimes used for groups of women. The word is Latin and means "one who is being (or has been) nourished". The term is not synonymous with "graduate"; one can be an alumnus without graduating (Burt Reynolds, alumnus but not graduate of Florida State University, is an example). The term is sometimes used to refer to a former employee or member of an organization, contributor, or inmate.

Etymology
The Latin noun alumnus means "foster son" or "pupil". It is derived from PIE *h₂el- (grow, nourish), and it is a variant of the Latin verb alere "to nourish". Separate, but from the same root, is the adjective almus "nourishing", found in the phrase Alma Mater, a title for a person's home university.

In Latin, alumnus is a legal term (Roman law) to describe a child placed in fosterage. According to John Boswell, the word "is nowhere defined in relation to status, privilege, or obligation." Citing the research of Henri Leclercq, Teresa Nani, and Beryl Rawson, who studied the many inscriptions about alumni, Boswell concluded that it referred to exposed children who were taken into a household where they were "regarded as somewhere between an heir and a slave, partaking in different ways of both categories." Despite the warmth of feelings between the parent and child, "an alumnus might be treated both as a beloved child and as a household servant."

Usage
An alumnus or alumna is a former student and most often a graduate of an educational institution (school, college, university). According to the United States Department of Education, the term alumnae is used in conjunction with either women's colleges or a female group of students. The term alumni is used in conjunction with either men's colleges, a male group of students, or a mixed group of students:

In accordance with the rules of grammar governing the inflexion of nouns in the Romance languages, the masculine plural alumni is correctly used for groups composed of both sexes: the alumni of Princeton University.

The term is sometimes informally shortened to "alum" (optional plural "alums").

Alumni reunions are popular events at many institutions. They are usually organized by alumni associations and are often social occasions for fundraising.

In British English, the terms "Old Boys", "Old Girls" or "Seniors" are often preferred.

See also
 :Category:Alumni by educational institution

References

Bibliography

External links

Academic terminology